Debeswar Sarmah (1897 – 1 August 1993) was an Indian politician. He was elected to the Lok Sabha, the lower house of the Parliament of India, as a member of the Indian National Congress. Sarmah died on 1 August 1993.

References

External links
Official biographical sketch in Parliament of India website

1897 births
1993 deaths
India MPs 1952–1957
Lok Sabha members from Assam
People from Jorhat district
Indian National Congress politicians from Assam